is a Japanese manga artist.
Riko was born in Tokyo.

Manga Works 
Love Monster

Hana Ni Nare!
Garden Story
Iton Yori Ai wo Komete
Oni ga Saku

References 

Year of birth missing (living people)
People from Tokyo
Manga artists from Tokyo
Living people